Paroi is an area in Seremban District, Negeri Sembilan, Malaysia. It is the eastern suburb of the city  of Seremban, comprising  many housing estates and villages. Numerous sport facilities are built in Paroi, especially the state stadium, the Tuanku Abdul Rahman Stadium. Another sports centre is the Paroi Sports and Youth Centre, which is a minor football stadium in Paroi. The Kompleks Sukan Negeri Paroi (Malay for 'State Sports Complex, Paroi') is located next to Tuanku Abdul Rahman Stadium, and opposite the Paroi Sports and Youth Centre.  Also in Paroi is a golf course  and a mosque.

Transportation
Paroi is served by Malaysia Federal Route 51. Jalan Paroi-Senawang links the suburb to Senawang. Inside Paroi is the Jalan Tok Dagang  which serves some of the towns in Paroi such as Taman Paroi Jaya and Taman Panchor Jaya. Jalan Tok Dagang also links Paroi to Jalan Jelebu and LEKAS EXIT 2106 Ampangan.

References

Populated places in Negeri Sembilan
Seremban District